The Utah Utes women's gymnastics team, also known as the Red Rocks, represents the University of Utah and competes at the Division I level of the National Collegiate Athletic Association (NCAA) as members of the Pac-12 Conference.  Home meets are held in the Jon M. Huntsman Center in Salt Lake City, Utah. As of the end of the 2021 season, the Red Rocks have won 10 national championships, including nine NCAA Gymnastics championships, and been runner-up nine times. The Red Rocks are the only team to have qualified for every NCAA Championships and have never finished lower than 10th.  The team was coached from its inception by Greg Marsden until his retirement after the 2015 season. Tom Farden is the current head coach, after the retirement of Megan Marsden in 2019.

History
The Utah Utes gymnastics team first competed in 1976. The team first appeared on television in 1978 and has appeared every year since then. The NCAA first sponsored women's gymnastics national championships in 1982. Utah is the only team to qualify for every national championship that has been held.

Pac-12 Conference
The University of Utah became a member of the newly expanded Pac-12 Conference in 2011, and the Red Rocks became one of eight teams in the conference to compete in women's gymnastics. Utah has taken the Pac-12 Championships five times since joining the conference, winning in 2014, 2015, 2017, 2021, and 2022. The Red Rocks have won or shared a portion of the Regular Season Pac-12 Championship since its inauguration - the 2020 season is the first time each of the eight Pac-12 teams competed against every other team in the conference. The Red Rocks won outright in 2020 and 2021, and shared the title in a four-way tie in 2022.

Utah gymnasts have won the individual all-around title at the Pac-12 Championship seven times:

Nickname
The nickname "Red Rocks" has its origins in the Utah Gymnastics 1992 media guide cover photo. At the time, all Utah women's sports teams used the moniker "Lady Utes". The name is a combination of "how rock solid they are, but also the red rock of southern Utah.”  The 1992 team won the NCAA championship, with the name sticking.

Roster

Head coach: Tom Farden
Assistant coaches: Carly Dockendorf, Jimmy Pratt, Myia Hambrick

National records

Utah has won a record 10 national championships (tied with Georgia). Nine of them were NCAA Women's Gymnastics championships and one was an AIAW Women's Gymnastics championship in 1981 before the NCAA adopted women's gymnastics.
Utah ties with Georgia for the record of the most consecutive NCAA national championships with 5 (1982–1986).
Utah has qualified for every national championship since its creation in 1976, the only team to do so.
Utah qualified for every AIAW championship between 1976 and 1981. After gymnastics was adopted by the NCAA in 1982, Utah is the only team to have qualified for every NCAA national championship.
Utah has the most All-American gymnast awards of any school with 379.
Utah gymnastics set the longest regular season home win streak of any NCAA sport at 23 years (1979–2002) and 170 meets.
Utah has led the nation in gymnastics attendance 36 times and has won ten all-women's sports attendance titles.
On March 6, 2015, Utah had an overflow crowd of 16,019 on hand for its win over Michigan, setting the NCAA gymnastics record for largest crowd in a single meet.
In the 2020 season, Utah averaged a record 15,273 fans per meet. Between 2010 and 2020, Utah averaged more than 14,500 fans a meet.

Coaches

Head coaches 

Greg Marsden was hired in 1976 to begin the gymnastics program. Marsden coached Utah for 40 straight years. He is the only collegiate gymnastics coach to amass 1,000 wins and earn Coach of the Year honors seven times. He has never had a team finish worse than tenth place overall.

In July 2009 Megan Marsden was named co-head coach of the Red Rocks. Megan, in addition to being Greg's wife, is a former member of the squad and has been an assistant coach since 1985.

After the 2015 season, Greg retired and his wife Megan and assistant coach Tom Farden were named co-head coaches. On 22 April 2019, Megan Marsden announced her retirement, and it was confirmed that current co-head coach Tom Farden would continue as the sole head coach.

Coaches for the 2021-2022 season

Post-season history

NCAA Champions
As of the end of the 2022 season, 16 different Utah gymnasts have won a total of 30 individual event championships.

Team records

Top team total

Top event totals

Top Individual All-Around

Past Olympians 
 Missy Marlowe (1988)
 Daria Bijak  (2008)
 Nansy Damianova  (2008)
 Corrie Lothrop (2008 alternate)
 MyKayla Skinner (2016 alternate, 2020) 
 Grace McCallum (2020) 
 Amelie Morgan  (2020) 
 Kara Eaker (2020 alternate)

References

External links

Utah Gymnastics on UtahUtes.com

 
Sports in Salt Lake City
1976 establishments in Utah
Sports clubs established in 1976